= Child marriage in Burundi =

In 2017 in Burundi, 20% of girls are married off before age 18. 3% are married before they turn 15.
